Limnaecia symplecta is a moth of the family Cosmopterigidae. It is known from Australia.

References

Limnaecia
Moths described in 1923
Moths of Australia
Taxa named by Alfred Jefferis Turner